Catherine Bégin (22 April 1939  – 29 December 2013) was a Canadian actress.

Biography

Catherine Bégin's parents were Quebec sound engineer Lucien Bégin (1895–1964) and Belgian accountant Marie-Louise Vanhavre (or Van Havre) (1906–1967), who married in 1935. Catherine was born in Bois-Colombes, France in 1939. They were in Paris when World War II was declared and fled to Périgueux, then Lisbon, arriving in Montreal in August 1941.

Bégin graduated from the Montreal Conservatory of Dramatic Art in 1959.

She portrayed more than a hundred roles on the stage, frequently including the classical (Euripides, Corneille, Racine, Molière, Musset, Marivaux, Beaumarchais, Chekhov), contemporary (Cocteau, Arrabal, Bernhardt), and Québécoise repertoires (Marcel Dubé, Réjean Ducharme, Jovette Marchessault, Évelyne de la Chenelière).

In the cinema, Bégin acted under the direction of Jean-Claude Lord (Délivrez-nous du mal, Panique), Denys Arcand (Stardom), Bernard Émond (Contre toute espérance), Ghyslaine Côté (Le Secret de ma mère) and Denis Côté (Elle veut le chaos). She embodied the disturbing character of Mademoiselle in Pascal Laugier's genre film Martyrs. One of her last performances in the cinema was Mamy Rose, under the direction of Xavier Dolan in Laurence Anyways.

As a theater instructor at Collège Lionel-Groulx for over 20 years, she helped train a generation of young actors.

Involved in the cause of a better recognition of the importance of the arts, and the improvement of the status of artists and creators in Quebec, Bégin acted as spokesperson for the World Coalition of Arts and Cultural Affairs (1986–1990). In particular, she participated in the works of the boards of directors of the Union des artistes (1976–1980) and the Association des directeurs de théâtre (1980–1984).

Bégin passed away in Montreal in 2013. Her archival fonds (P964) are housed in the Bibliothèque et Archives nationales du Québec.

Performances

Theatre

Film and television

Awards and distinctions

1998 – 
2005 –  for best female performance in a supporting role, Jouliks
2014 – Prix Gémeaux (posthumous) for Female Interpretation: Digital Media – Fiction for Michaëlle en sacrament

References

1939 births
2013 deaths
People from Bois-Colombes
French emigrants to Quebec
French Quebecers
Actresses from Montreal